Maurice de Berkeley, 4th Baron Berkeley (c. 1330 – 8 June 1368), The Valiant, feudal baron of Berkeley, of Berkeley Castle in Gloucestershire, was an English peer. His epithet, and that of each previous and subsequent head of his family, was coined by John Smyth of Nibley (died 1641), steward of the Berkeley estates, the biographer of the family and author of "Lives of the Berkeleys".

He was born in Berkeley Castle in Gloucestershire, the eldest son and heir of Thomas de Berkeley, 3rd Baron Berkeley by his wife Lady Margaret Mortimer.

In August 1338 Berkeley married Elizabeth le Despenser, daughter of Hugh Despenser the younger by his wife Eleanor de Clare. By Elizabeth he had seven children as follows:
Thomas de Berkeley, 5th Baron Berkeley (1352/3-1417), eldest son and heir, who married Margaret de Lisle, Baroness Lisle
Sir James de Berkeley (born c. 1355 – 13 June 1405) married Elizabeth Bluet; one of their sons was James Berkeley, 1st Baron Berkeley
John de Berkeley (c. 1357 – 1381)
Maurice de Berkeley (born c. 1358) married Jone Hereford
Catherine de Berkeley (born c. 1360)
Agnes de Berkeley (born c. 1363)
Elizabeth de Berkeley (born c. 1365)

Ancestry

References

Sources 
thepeerage.com Accessed April 21, 2008
Richardson, Douglas, Kimball G. Everingham, and David Faris. Plantagenet Ancestry: A Study in Colonial and Medieval Families. Royal ancestry series. (p. 99) Baltimore, Md: Genealogical Pub. Co, 2004. Retrieved April 21, 2008

1330s births
1368 deaths
4
People from Berkeley, Gloucestershire
Maurice